The 1997 Russian Indoor Athletics Championships was the 6th edition of the national championship in indoor track and field for Russia. It was held on 21–23 February at the WGAFC Indoor Stadium in Volgograd. A total of 26 events (13 for men and 13 for women) were contested over the three-day competition. It was used for selection of the Russian team for the 1997 IAAF World Indoor Championships. 

The Russian Combined Events Indoor Championships was held separately on 15–17 February in Lipetsk at the Jubilee Sports Palace. Former Ukrainian Lev Lobodin competed in his first Russian championships and set a new Russian record for the men's heptathlon with 6196 points.

Results

Men

Women

Russian Combined Events Indoor Championships

Men

Women

International team selection
Following the results of the championships, taking into account the qualifying standards, the Russian team for the 1997 IAAF World Indoor Championships included:

Men

400 m: Ruslan Mashchenko†
4 × 400 m relay: Ruslan Mashchenko, Dmitriy Bey, Dmitry Golovastov, Dmitry Kosov, Dmitriy Guzov
1500 m: Vyacheslav Shabunin
3000 m: Sergey Drygin
60 m hurdles: Andrey Kislykh
High jump: Sergey Klyugin
Pole vault: Maksim Tarasov, Vadim Strogalev
Long jump: Evgeniy Tretyak, Kirill Sosunov
Triple jump: Aleksandr Aseledchenko, Gennadiy Markov
Shot put: Pavel Chumachenko

Women

60 m: Irina Privalova†, Nadezhda Roshchupkina
200 m: Svetlana Goncharenko, Yekaterina Lescheva
400 m: Olga Kotlyarova
4 × 400 m relay: Olga Kotlyarova, Tatyana Alekseyeva, Yekaterina Bakhvalova, Natalya Sharova, Tatyana Chebykina, Svetlana Goncharenko
800 m: Irina Biryukova
1500 m: Yekaterina Podkopayeva, Margarita Marusova
3000 m: Olga Yegorova
60 m hurdles: Svetlana Laukhova, Irina Korotya
High jump: Viktoriya Fyodorova, Yuliya Lyakhova
Pole vault: Svetlana Abramova, Yelena Belyakova
Long jump: Nina Perevedentseva, Vera Olenchenko
Triple jump: Inna Lasovskaya†, Natalya Kayukova
Shot put: Irina Korzhanenko
Pentathlon: Tatyana Gordeyeva

† Had exemption for selection and allowed not to compete at the national championships

References

Results
На стадионах страны и мира. Чемпионат России по многоборьям // Лёгкая атлетика : журнал. — 1996. — № 4. — С. 23—24.
Шанс для молодых // Лёгкая атлетика : журнал. — 1996. — № 3. — С. 4—5.

Russian Indoor Athletics Championships
Russian Indoor Athletics Championships
Russian Indoor Athletics Championships
Russian Indoor Athletics Championships
Sports competitions in Volgograd